Yew Chung International School of Silicon Valley (YCISSV) is a private Preschool, Elementary and Middle School in the San Francisco Bay Area that provides an international education with an emphasis on Chinese Studies. YCIS is a non-profit 501(c)3 and is accredited by the Western Association of Schools and Colleges (WASC). The main campus is located at 310 Easy Street, Mountain View, California. The preschool campus is .4 miles away at 199 E. Middlefield Road, also in Mountain View.

YCIS Silicon Valley is part of the Yew Chung Education Foundation, which was established in 1932.. YCIS also has schools in Hong Kong, Shanghai, Beijing, Chongqing and Qingdao.

Yew Chung International School of Silicon Valley offers a Chinese-English bilingual program. While English is the primary language of instruction, YCIS focuses on bilingual learning through the utilization of the "co-teaching" model (classes are administered by both Western and Chinese teachers, in order to encourage fluency.)

History

The first YCIS was established in Hong Kong in 1932. Since then, the school has grown to include campuses in Hong Kong, Shanghai, Beijing, Chongqing, Qingdao and Silicon Valley, USA.

YCIS Silicon Valley opened in 2002 with fewer than 10 students. The school currently has an enrollment of over 240 students in Preschool through Middle School. Students represent over 40 zip codes in the Bay Area. Graduates of YCIS Silicon Valley go on to attend private, public charter and neighborhood schools including:  Harker, Castilleja, Nueva, Keys, Girls’ Middle School, Valley Christian, The King's Academy, Bullis Charter, Summit Denali and more.

In 2011, YCIS Silicon Valley expanded to include a new preschool campus on East Middlefield Road, which is close to the Main Campus at Easy Street.

In 2014, the addition of portable classrooms at the Main Campus made it possible for the school to add middle school grades.

Curriculum

Yew Chung International School of Silicon Valley offers education to students from Preschool (at age 2), Elementary School and Middle School.

Leadership

Dr. Betty Chan Po-king is Director of Yew Chung schools, including Secondary, Primary and Early Childhood Education (ECE) Sections.

Network of Schools 
 Yew Chung International School of Hong Kong
 Yew Chung International School of Shanghai
 Yew Chung International School of Beijing
 Yew Chung International School of Chongqing
 Yew Chung International School of Qingdao
 Yew Chung International School of Silicon Valley

External links 
 Yew Chung International School of Silicon Valley

References

Education in Santa Clara County, California
Educational institutions established in 2002
Private K–8 schools in California
2002 establishments in California